Seetharampet is a village in Ranga Reddy district in Andhra Pradesh, India. It falls under Ibrahimpatnam mandal.

Schools
Pragna College of Education is located in the village.

References

Villages in Ranga Reddy district